Nine ships of the Royal Navy have borne the name HMS Albion after Albion, an archaic name for Great Britain:
  was a 74-gun third-rate ship of the line launched in 1763. She was converted into a floating battery in 1794 and was wrecked in 1797.
  was the mercantile Albion launched at Sunderland in 1797 that the Royal Navy purchased in 1798 for service as a sloop. The Navy sold her at Sheerness in 1803. She became a transport. It is possible that she foundered in August 1808.
  was a 74-gun third rate launched in 1802. She was used for harbour service from 1831 and was broken up in 1836.
  was a 90-gun second rate launched in 1842. She was converted to screw propulsion in 1861 and was broken up in 1884.
  was a Canopus-class pre-dreadnought battleship launched in 1898 and sold in 1919.
  was a Centaur-class aircraft carrier launched in 1947.  She was converted into a commando carrier in 1962, sold in 1973, resold later that year and then broken up.
  is an Albion-class Landing Platform Dock ship launched in 2001 and currently in service.

Other RN vessels named "Albion" were;
 Albion II, an armed trawler taken up in 1915 and sunk by a mine in 1916.
 Albion II, a Bristol paddle steamer used for minesweeping in 1915.
 Albion III, a steam yacht, taken up from 1916 to 1919.

Hired armed vessels
 Between 27 April 1793 and 11 September 1794, the Navy employed a ship named Albion, of 393 tons burthen.
 During the period of the Napoleonic Wars, the Royal Navy twice hired armed cutters named Albion, though these are probably the same vessel. See: Hired armed cutter Albion.

Battle honours
 Algiers 1816
 Navarino 1827
 Crimea 1854-5
 Dardanelles 1915

citations and references
Citations

References
 
 

Royal Navy ship names